Rajendra Gupta (born 17 October 1947) is an Indian film, television and theatre actor and director who is known for his television roles of Adina Beg Khan Sahib e Azam in 2010 series of Maharaja Ranjit Singh, Pandit Jagannath in the 1990s Doordarshan fantasy television series Chandrakanta and Sudha's father – Jagat Narayan – in the 1998–2001 Sony TV drama Saaya.

An alumnus of the National School of Drama (1972 batch), Gupta had worked in numerous television serials and films. He played the role of the Mukhiya (village headman) of Champaner in the Oscar-nominated 2001 film Lagaan. He also played the role of Kesri Narayan in the TV serial Chidiya Ghar, that aired on Sab TV. Currently, he is portraying the role of Pandit Jagannath Mishra  in Jagannath Aur Purvi Ki Dosti Anokhi at Sony TV.

Life

Gupta was born in a business family in Panipat and did his graduation from the Kurukshetra University. His father known as Master Ji ran a woolen textiles business but Gupta had no interest in the business; his interests lay, instead, in dramatics and theatre. Gupta met wife-to-be, Veena, a Christian, in Indore when he went there to take part in a college play. Since Veena's parents did not agree to their marriage, the couple eloped to Bhopal, got married, and then returned home.

In 1972, Gupta enrolled himself at the New Delhi-based National School of Drama and completed his post-graduation in direction.

Gupta's daughter, Ravee Gupta, is a television actress who is married to television actor Manoj Bidwai.

Career

Films and television

Gupta and his family moved to Bombay in 1985 and he started working in television serials; three years later he entered films. Gupta has acted in innumerable television serials and films; so much so that in 1990, his name was included in the Limca Book of Records for appearing in the highest number of television serials – over 40 of them.

In a 2001 interview with the Times of India, he mentioned that of all the films that he has done, he is proud of his work in Lagaan (2001) and Salim Langde Pe Mat Ro (1989). Since then he has gone on to work in critically acclaimed films such as Amu, Sehar and Guru. In the same interview, he said that among his television roles, his work in the Syed Mirza-Kundan Shah serial Intezaar (as the Senior Station Master), the fantasy series Chandrakanta (as Pandit Jagarnath) and Saaya (as Jagat Narayan) were among his best.

Stage

In spite of having played meaty parts in many films and television serials, theatre is Gupta's first love – his ultimate destination. He has acted in numerous plays and has directed at least twenty of his own.

Gupta is the actor-director of plays such as Sarphire and Jaheez Hatyare, both based on writer-philosopher Albert Camus' French play The Just Assassins, and Sooraj Ki Antim Kiran Se Sooraj Ke Pehle Kiran Tak, based on Surendra Verma's 1965 Hindi play.

Gupta has acted in many Hindi plays, but Chanakyashastra and Kanyadaan, a play by noted playwright Vijay Tendulkar, are two plays he did in English.

Rajendra Gupta and noted actress Neena Gupta run a theatre production company – Sahaj Productions.

Filmography

Film

Jawalaa Dahej Ki (1982)
Yeh Woh Manzil To Nahin (1987) as Vice-Chancellor Asthana
Main Zinda Hoon (1988)
Salim Langde Pe Mat Ro (1989) as Aslam
Haque (1991) as Nandi - Editor
Jaan Se Pyaara (1992) as Police Commissioner
Meri Pyari Nimmo (1993)
Pratimurti (1993) as Manager
Taaqat (1995) as Anil Rege
Tarpan  (1995) as Lakhan Thakur
The Gambler (1995) as Doctor
Daava (1997) as Advocate Chagan Chamunda
Bhai (1997) as Malik
Aaya Yauwan Jhoom Ke (1999)
Dil Kya Kare (1999, Kannada film) as Lawyer
Benaam (1999)
Hum To Mohabbat Karega (2000) as Gul Mahomad
Mission Kashmir (2000) as Chief Secretary Deshpande
Raja Ko Rani Se Pyar Ho Gaya (2000) as Mohit's Friend
Laado (2000) as Urmi's Father-In-Law (Haryanvi Movies)
Lagaan (2001) as Sarpanch (Mukhiya Ji)
Tum Bin (2001) as Iftekaar
Yeh Raaste Hai Pyar Ke (2001) as Doctor
Shaheed-E-Azam (2002)
Swaraaj (2003)
Basti (2003) as Commissioner Jabbar
Mumbai Se Aaya Mera Dost (2003) as Sameer
Ek Hindustani (2003)
Satya Bol (2004)
Mr Lonely Miss Lovely (2004)
Krishna Cottage (2004) as J.C. College's Principal
Deewaar: Let's Bring Our Heroes Home (2004) as Anand
Hatya (2004) as Murugan
Amu (2005) as K.K.
Sehar (2005) as ADG (Law and Order) Arun Kapoor
James (2005) as Nalin Yadav
Koi Aap Sa (2005) as Mahesh - Simran's dad
Guru (2007) as Kantilal Desai (Guru's Father)
Cape Karma (2007) as Kamini's Dad
Apne (2007) as Sardar Bhullar
Chamku (2008) as Vinod Sood - Home Secretary
Well Done Abba (2009) as Irrigation Minister - Mantri Garu
Do Paise Ki Dhoop, Chaar Aane Ki Baarish (2009) as Banker, Taxi Driver
Striker (2010) as Surya's father
Aakrosh (2010) as Geeta's dad
Rakht Charitra (2010, Hindi, Telugu, Tamil) as Pratap rav's father
Rakta Charitra 2 (2010) as Veera Bhadra
Rukke Padge (2010) as Mama
Ek Noor (2011) as Ranjit's father
Tanu Weds Manu (2011) as Rajendra Trivedi
Yeh Faasley (2011) as Joe Fernandes
Trapped in Tradition: Rivaaz (2011) as Mangatram
He... (2011)
The Best Exotic Marigold Hotel (2011) as Manoj
Paan Singh Tomar (2012) as Sports Coach (H.S. Randhawa)
Maximum (2012) as Babuji
Riwayat (2012) as Dr. Amod Gupta
Nirankush (2013)
Saptapadii (2013) as Terrorist 1
Himmatwala (2013) as Ravi's Chacha
Bobby Jasoos (2014) as Abba
Tanu Weds Manu Returns (2015) as Rajendra Trivedi
Mohalla Assi (2015) as Babu Lal Dwivedi
Phamous (2018) as Laali's Father
Vishwaroopam II (2018) as Seshadri
PM Narendra Modi (2019) as Damodardas Modi
 Bhavai (2021) as Panditji
Sooryavanshi (2021) as Naem Khan
Urf Ghanta (2021) as Doctor

Television

Kahan Gaye Woh Log (1985)
Yatra (1986) as Drama Group Member (1986-1987)
Nukkad (1987) as Sudhakar Kadam, Municipal Corporator (3 episodes)
Bharat Ek Khoj (1988) as Ratansen / Raja Nandkumar
Mirza Ghalib (1988)
 Intezaar (1989) as the Senior Station Master
Talaash (1992) as Fardu
Chekhov ki Duniya (Indian TV series) (1990s) (The serial was a Hindi language adaptation of the selected short stories of Russian writer Anton Chekhov) as the narrator of the serial and also as an actor in different roles depending on the short story being played out in the episodes.
Byomkesh Bakshi (1993) as Mahidhar Chowdhury (Episode: Tasvir Chor)
Chandrakanta (1994-1996) as Pandit Jagannath/Shani (Twin Brother of Pandit Jagannath)
Shaktimaan (1996) as Dr Vishwas, Geeta Vishwas's Father and a paranormal scientist
Byomkesh Bakshi(Season 2) (1997) as Santosh Samaddar (Episode: Balak Jasoos)
Saaya (1998) as Jagat Narayan
Ullanghan (1999)
Jai Ganesha (1999, TV Series) as Narada
Choti Si Aasha (1999)
Aashirwad (1998)
Khara Dudh for DD Punjabi
Parsa (2004)
Raavan (2005-2008) as Sumali
Banoo Main Teri Dulhan (2006) as Raghav Pratap Singh
Kuchh Is Tara (2007-2008) as Anand Godbole
Ranbir Rano (2008) as Rano's Father (2008)
Hum Ladkiyan (2008) as Thakur Ayodhya Singh
Maharaja Ranjit Singh (2010–2011) as Subedar of Hoshiarpur Adina Beg Azam
Balika Vadhu (2009–2012) as Mahaveer Singh
Chidiya Ghar (2011–2017) as Kesri Narayan
Kahaani Chandrakanta Ki (2011) as Pandit Jagannath 
Rehna Hai Teri Palkon Ki Chhaon Mein(2009) as Surya Partap Thakur
Samvidhaan (2014) as Dr. Rajendra Prasad
 Gujarat Bhavan Ishara TV
 Jagannath Aur Purvi Ki Dosti Anokhi as Pt. Jagannath Mishra (2022)
 Bed Stories as Ramdas (2022)

Stage
As director
Sarphire / Jaheez Hatyare (1985, 2003, 2004, 2006)
Sooraj Ki Antim Kiran Se Sooraj Ke Pehle Kiran Tak
Dikhti..Khoob Ho!

As actor
Sarphire
Sar Sar Sarla
Sooraj Ki Antim Kiran Se Sooraj Ke Pehle Kiran Tak
Chanakyashastra
Kanyadaan
Dikhti..Khoob Ho!

Awards
 Gupta won a RAPA Award in 2000 for his performance in Saaya.

References

External links

Indian male film actors
Indian male television actors
Indian male stage actors
Indian theatre directors
National School of Drama alumni
Living people
Male actors in Hindi cinema
Kurukshetra University alumni
People from Panipat
Male actors from Haryana
20th-century Indian male actors
21st-century Indian male actors
1947 births
Fellows of the American Physical Society